Samoana thurstoni is a species of tropical, air-breathing land snail, a terrestrial, pulmonate, gastropod mollusk in the family Partulidae. This species is endemic to American Samoa. It is threatened by habitat loss.

References

External links
 

T
Invertebrates of American Samoa
Molluscs of Oceania
Endangered fauna of Oceania
Taxonomy articles created by Polbot